Pro Football Highlights, also known as Football News, Football Highlights and Time for Football, was a 30-minute television sports review program broadcast by ABC (1950–1951) and the DuMont Television Network (1951–1954). The ABC version aired Fridays at 8:30 pm ET and the DuMont version aired Wednesdays at 7:30pm ET from 1951 to 1954.

Episode status
Two episodes of Time for Football (which aired during the 1954 season), exist, featuring games from Week 1 and Week 6.

See also
List of programs broadcast by the DuMont Television Network
List of surviving DuMont Television Network broadcasts
1950-51 United States network television schedule
1951-52 United States network television schedule
1952-53 United States network television schedule
Football Sidelines
Football This Week

References

Bibliography
David Weinstein, The Forgotten Network: DuMont and the Birth of American Television (Philadelphia: Temple University Press, 2004) 
Alex McNeil, Total Television, Fourth edition (New York: Penguin Books, 1980) 
Tim Brooks and Earle Marsh, The Complete Directory to Prime Time Network TV Shows, Third edition (New York: Ballantine Books, 1964)

External links
Pro Football Highlights at IMDB
DuMont historical website

1950 American television series debuts
1954 American television series endings
ABC Sports
American Broadcasting Company original programming
Black-and-white American television shows
National Football League on television
DuMont sports programming